The 1230s BC is a decade which lasted from 1239 BC to 1230 BC.

Events and trends
 1230 BC – Battle of Nihriya
 1234 BC – Theseus of Athens begins his 30-year reign (if the end of his reign is agreed to have ended in 1204 BC).

References

 

es:Años 1230 a. C.